Michael V. Scott (born 1968) is an American musician and actor (bass and vocals) who played in the band Godspeed with former teen idol Leif Garrett. He was also in the Industrial Metal band Deadtime Stories (bass, lead vocals) and The Distortions (bass). In addition to music, he had a brief acting career in the early 1990s, and has appeared on The Rosie O'Donnell Show, VH1's Behind The Music, and A & E Biography.

External links

The Distortions official website

1971 births
Living people
Place of birth missing (living people)
American male bass guitarists
21st-century American singers
21st-century American bass guitarists
21st-century American male singers